Oncostemma is a species of plants in the Apocynaceae first described as a genus in 1893. It contains only one known species, Oncostemma cuspidatum, native to  the Island of São Tomé off the coast of central Africa.

References

Monotypic Apocynaceae genera